Jakob Blom (23 September 1898 – 26 May 1966) was a Dutch politician and trade unionist.

Born in Oud-Beijerland, after World War II, Blom became prominent in the General Union of Civil Servants (ABVA), winning election as its president in 1949.  He also joined the Labour Party (PvDA), and in 1952 was elected to the House of Representatives.  In 1954, he also became general secretary of the International Federation of Unions of Employees in Public and Civil Services, serving for two years.

Blom left his trade union posts in 1958, to focus on his political career.  From 1963, he was chair of the Defense Commission, and he also devoted time to promoting compensation for civil servants.  He died in 1966, while still in office.

References

1898 births
1966 deaths
Dutch trade unionists
Labour Party (Netherlands) politicians
Members of the House of Representatives (Netherlands)